Stanley Carl "Bulldog" Jonathan (born September 5, 1955) is a Canadian former ice hockey left winger, most notably for the Boston Bruins of the National Hockey League, for whom he played for parts of eight seasons. He featured in two Stanley Cup Finals with the Bruins (1977, 1978). Jonathan was born in Ohsweken, Ontario, but grew up in Hagersville, Ontario.

Playing career
Stan Jonathan was drafted in the fifth round (86th overall) of the 1975 NHL entry draft by the Bruins. Ignored by most other scouts and by Bruins general manager Harry Sinden, Jonathan was picked up thanks to the shrewdness of Don Cherry, who had seen him play with the Peterborough Petes earlier that season, Jonathan's third season in Peterborough. Cherry stated later that the proudest discovery of his hockey career was Stan Jonathan.

While Jonathan played with Peterborough, they represented Canada well as they placed third at the first unofficial world junior championship in 1973–1974.

Jonathan started his NHL career with one game in the 1975–76 NHL season, before being called up permanently for the 1976–77 season. He typified Bruins hockey, displaying both outstanding offensive ability and toughness. Jonathan was adept at knocking in rebounds, and Cherry, his coach at the time, stated that he had the most accurate shot in the league. As a rookie, he led all NHL players in shooting percentage, putting goals in at a clip of 23.9%. That year, 1977–78, was his most productive season as he scored 27 goals with 25 assists.  He also had 116 penalty minutes that year. his second season, he was again among the top-ten players in shooting percentage, at 22.3%. That year he won the Bruins' "7th Player Award" voted on by the fans for the player who exceeded expectations.

Arguably Jonathan's most famous moment was his savage beating of Pierre Bouchard in a brawl during Game 4 of the 1978 Stanley Cup Finals. Challenged by Bouchard, who outweighed Jonathan by thirty pounds and stood six inches taller, Jonathan held his own, breaking Bouchard's nose and cheekbone and knocking him to the ice.

His 1978–79 season was shortened by an injury, but Jonathan played in all 11 playoff games of 1979. Jonathan scored a hat-trick in Game #6 of Boston's semifinal series versus Montreal, contributing to a 5–2 win in game 6 of the semi-finals against the Montreal Canadiens, which forced a game 7. He returned the following year and scored 21 goals and 19 assists.  He also added 208 penalty minutes.

The Bruins traded him to the Pittsburgh Penguins on November 8, 1982, in exchange for cash.  Jonathan played 19 games for Pittsburgh and retired after the 1983 season. He finished his NHL career with 91 goals and 110 assists in 411 games.

He is a full-blooded Tuscarora, born in Ohsweken, Ontario, a Six Nations reserve near Brantford, Ontario, Canada.

Stan Jonathan was charged with criminal negligence in a hunting accident on the Six Nations reserve that killed Peter Kosid of Hamilton, Ontario, on Sunday, November 11, 2012. The criminal charges against Jonathan in the hunting death of Peter Kosid have been withdrawn.

Career statistics

Regular season and playoffs

International

References

External links

1975 NHL Amateur Draft: Stan Jonathan

1955 births
Living people
Baltimore Skipjacks players
Boston Bruins draft picks
Boston Bruins players
Canadian ice hockey left wingers
Dayton Gems players
First Nations sportspeople
Ice hockey people from Ontario
Indianapolis Racers draft picks
Sportspeople from the County of Brant
Peterborough Petes (ice hockey) players
Pittsburgh Penguins players
Rochester Americans players
Sportspeople from Haldimand County